The Institute of Indigenous Government, Canada's First Nations College, is a publicly funded post-secondary education institute located in Burnaby, British Columbia. Established in 1995, the institute was originally located in the Gastown neighbourhood of Vancouver.  Its corporate owners, members, faculty, and students were made up of indigenous people from around the world, in the majority.  In September 2007, the Institute of Indigenous Government became part of the Nicola Valley Institute of Technology; an aboriginal-run, private institute in Merritt, British Columbia, that was started in 1983.

The Institute awarded credentials (Bachelor degrees, Associate Degrees, Diplomas, or Certificates) in the following areas of studies:
 Animal Welfare
 Adult Dogwood Diploma (British Columbia High school diploma)
 Business Administration
 Criminology
 English as a Second Language (ESL)
 First Nations Studies
 General Arts
 International Studies
 Human Resources Administration
 Not-for-Profit Management
 Psychology
 Social Work
 Wildlife Management

See also
List of institutes and colleges in British Columbia
List of universities in British Columbia
Higher education in British Columbia
Education in Canada

References

External links

Nicola Valley Institute of Technology

Education in Burnaby
Educational institutions established in 1995
First Nations education
Indigenous universities and colleges in North America
Universities and colleges in British Columbia
1995 establishments in British Columbia